Edward Armstrong (15 February 1881 – 28 April 1963) was an Australian cricketer. He played in three first-class matches for Queensland between 1905 and 1912.

See also
 List of Queensland first-class cricketers

References

External links
 

1881 births
1963 deaths
Australian cricketers
Queensland cricketers
Cricketers from Brisbane